Pedacherlopalle is a village in Prakasam district of the Indian state of Andhra Pradesh. It is the mandal headquarters of Pedacherlopalle mandal in Kandukur revenue division.

References 

Villages in Prakasam district